Labyu with an Accent is a 2022 Philippine romantic-comedy film starring Coco Martin and Jodi Sta. Maria. It was released theatrically on December 25, 2022 as an entry to the 2022 Metro Manila Film Festival.

Premise
The film centers around the meeting of two different characters. Gabo (Coco Martin), a man in the Philippines who has took multiple types of jobs as a means of livelihood, and Trisha (Jodi Sta. Maria), a long-time expatriate worker who has been living in the United States for 20 years. Trisha meets Gabo, as she returns home to the Philippines.

Cast
Main cast
Coco Martin as Gabriel "Gabo" Madlangbayan
Jodi Sta. Maria as Trisha
Supporting cast

John Estrada
Michael de Mesa as Walter
Jaclyn Jose as Linda
Nova Villa
Joross Gamboa
Rochelle Pangilinan as Daisy Santos
G. Toengi as Vivian
Rafael Rosell as Matt
Donita Rose
Carlo Muñoz
Cheena Crab as Fe
Nikki Valdez
Zeus Collins
Neil Coleta
Jojit Lorenzo
Manuel Chua
Nash Aguas as Dino
JJ Quilantang
Iyannah Reyes
Madam Inutz
Jhai Ho 
Marc Solis
Jay Gonzaga
John Medina
Bassilyo
Smugglaz

Production
Labyu with an Accent is a film made under ABS-CBN Film Productions, the production outfit of Star Cinema. It is directed by Coco Martin and written by Patrick Valencia. Martin who is also a starring actor of the film, has his directorial role credited under his legal name, Rodel P. Nacianceno rather than his stage name. Martin also consulted fellow director Malu Sevilla for the film.

The film was announced in July 2022 as one of the first four entries submitted as a script for the 2022 Metro Manila Film Festival. The plot for the film was pitched to ABS-CBN by Martin himself who also proposed that Jodi Sta. Maria made his co-starring leading lady. Martin based the story on both his and Sta. Maria's personal experience working abroad. Martin himself worked as an Overseas Filipino Worker in Canada. He created the concept when he was still working with the television series Ang Probinsyano which ended its run in August 2022. This is the second time that Martin drew from his experience as an OFW, as prior to bagging the lead in Ang Probinsyano, Martin was supposed to do a film and a teleserye based around the concept which were both eventually released as Padre de Familia and On the Wings of Love, respectively.

Principal photography sometime after Ang Probinsyano ended airing. Filming took place mostly in Los Angeles in the United States although some scenes were filmed in the Philippines.  Martin preferred to work with minimal rehearsals and script guidance for the filming of Labyu with an Accent, believing overreliance on the script "takes away the magic".

Martin presents the film as a gift to followers of his and Sta. Maria's television series Ang Probinsyano and The Broken Marriage Vow.

Release
Labyu with an Accent was released on cinemas in the Philippines on December 25, 2022, as one of the eight official entries of the 2022 Metro Manila Film Festival.

Notes

References

Philippine romantic comedy films
Films shot in Los Angeles